Articles (arranged alphabetically) related to Angola include:

A
Agostinho Neto -
Alves Reis - 
Angola Avante -
Angolan Civil War -
Angola Telecom -
António Jacinto -
Architecture of Angola -
Giant Sable Antelope

B
Bailundo-
Bailundo (kingdom) -
Bailundo revolt-
Banco Nacional de Angola -
Basketball in Angola -
Baobab -
Benguela - Benguela railway

C
Cabinda Province-
Cingolo -
Citata -
Civula -
Ciyaka-
Communications in Angola -
COVID-19 pandemic in Angola -
Culture of Angola

D
Demographics of Angola

E
Economy of Angola - 
Ekekete-
Endiama -

F
Football in Angola - 
Foreign relations of Angola -
José de Fontes Pereira

G
Geography of Angola

H
History of Angola -
Huambo

I
Instituto Nacional da Aviação Civil - Isabel dos Santos

K

Kakonda -
Kalukembe -
Kingdom of Ndulu-
Kuduro

L
Land tenure in Angola - LGBT rights in Angola (Gay rights) - List of ambassadors of Angola - List of Angolan films - List of cities and towns in Angola - Luanda - Luanda Railway

M
Military of Angola -
MPLA -
MSTelcom - 
Municipalities of Angola -

N 
Ngalangi

O 
Ovimbundu

P
Politics of Angola - 
President of Angola -
Prime Minister of Angola -
Provinces of Angola -

S
Giant Sable Antelope -
Fernando Dos Santos -
José Eduardo dos Santos-
Jonas Savimbi -
Serra da Chela -
Sonair -
Sonangol

T
Transport in Angola

U
Umbundu-
UNITA

V 
Viye

W
Welwitschia mirabilis

See also

Lists of country-related topics

 
Angola